The Dutch A15 motorway (Rijksweg 15) is a set of two motorways in the Netherlands, the A15 and the A18.

Connection between A15 and A18 
In governmental plans, the A15 and A18 together were meant to be one long motorway from the Europoort harbor near Rotterdam towards the town of Varsseveld in the east of the country. However, the section between the interchange Ressen and Zevenaar was not completed. To avoid confusion for drivers, the eastern part of the road has been given a different number: A18. Construction of the extension began in 2019 and is planned for completion between 2021 and 2023. It is unclear whether the A18 route will be renumbered as the A15 once the connection to the A12 is made.

Section A15 (and N15) 
The westernmost part of the road, between the Maasvlakte and exit 8 is officially not an Autosnelweg (motorway), and is therefore known as the N15. However, it has most characteristics of a motorway, such as a central barrier and a hard shoulder until it crosses the Coloradoweg on the Maasvlakte. As of exit 8, the road becomes an official motorway, called A15. Together with the Betuweroute, which runs parallel on several stretches, the A15 is a main transport corridor from the Port of Rotterdam to the east.

Reconstruction works 
In 2010, the A15 motorway near Rotterdam has been widened between the exit Brielle and the interchange Vaanplein. To the western part, between Brielle and Spijkenisse, one lane in each direction will be added, making it a 2x3 road. As for the eastern part of the section, between Spijkenisse and the Vaanplein, the current 2x3 road has been upgraded to a 2x5 road. The complex project in this highly industrialized part of Rotterdam caused an extensive loss of €103 million to one of the main contractors of the project, Ballast Nedam, in the year 2014.

Section A18 (and N18) 
The A18 motorway is a short motorway, with only 5 exits and 20 kilometers. The western terminus, interchange Oud-Dijk, can only be used by traffic to and from the western part of the A12. Traffic to/from the A12 east of this interchange (most likely from the German BAB 3 road) will have to use local roads to get from the A18 to the A12 or vice versa.

After its eastern terminus near Varsseveld, road number 18 continues as a regional non-motorway road, therefore being called N18. This road passes the towns Harreveld, Lichtenvoorde, Groenlo, and Eibergen on its way to the city Enschede.

Exit list

References 

Motorways in the Netherlands
Motorways in Gelderland
Motorways in South Holland
Motorways in Utrecht (province)